The 2004 Copa América was the 41st edition of the Copa América, the South-American championship for international association football teams. The competition was organized by CONMEBOL, South America's football governing body, and was held in Peru, who hosted the tournament for the sixth time, from 6 to 25 July.

The tournament was won by Brazil in a shootout over Argentina. This made Brazil hold the World Cup and Copa América titles simultaneously for the second time in history, as happened after 1997 Copa América.

There is no qualifying tournament for the final tournament. CONMEBOL's 10 South American countries participated, along with two more invited countries, making a total of twelve teams competing in the tournament. The two invited countries for this edition of the Copa América were Mexico and Costa Rica.

Venues

Squads

Each association had to present a list of twenty-two players to compete in the competition.

Officials

  Héctor Baldassi
  René Ortubé
  Márcio Rezende de Freitas
  Rubén Selman
  Óscar Ruiz
  William Mattus
  Pedro Ramos
  Marco Antonio Rodríguez
  Carlos Amarilla
  Eduardo Lecca
  Gilberto Hidalgo
  Gustavo Brand

Draw
The draw for the competition took place on 8 March 2004 at the Lima Art Museum in Lima. The teams were divided into three groups of four teams each. For logistical reasons the three teams from Pots 1 & 4 were manually assigned to their groups ahead of the draw.

Group stage
Each team plays one match against each of the other teams within the same group. Three points are awarded for a win, one point for a draw and zero points for a defeat.

First and second placed teams, in each group, advance to the quarter-finals.
The best third placed team and the second best third placed team, also advance to the quarter-finals.

Tie-breaking criteria
Teams were ranked on the following criteria:
1. Greater number of points in all group matches
2. Goal difference in all group matches
3. Greater number of goals scored in all group matches
4. Head-to-head results
5. Drawing of lots by the CONMEBOL Organising Committee

 All times local (UTC-5)

Group A

Group B

Group C

Ranking of third-placed teams
At the end of the first stage, a comparison was made between the third-placed teams of each group. The two best third-placed teams advanced to the quarterfinals.

Knockout stage

Quarter-finals

Semi-finals

Third-place match

Final

Result

Goal scorers
With seven goals, Adriano is the top scorer in the tournament. In total, 78 goals were scored by 55 different players, with none of them credited as own goal.

7 goals
  Adriano

3 goals
  Kily González
  Javier Saviola
  Carlos Bueno

2 goals

  Luciano Figueroa
  Lucho González
  Carlos Tevez
  Abel Aguilar
  Tressor Moreno
  Luís Fabiano
  Agustín Delgado
  Nolberto Solano
  Fabián Estoyanoff
  Vicente Sánchez
  Darío Silva

1 goal

  Roberto Ayala
  Andrés D'Alessandro
  César Delgado
  Juan Pablo Sorín
  Lorgio Álvarez
  Joaquín Botero
  Gonzalo Galindo
  Alex
  Juan
  Luisão
  Ricardo Oliveira
  Sebastián González
  Rafael Olarra
  Edwin Congo
  Sergio Herrera
  Edixon Perea
  Andy Herron
  Luis Marín
  Mauricio Wright
  Franklin Salas
  Héctor Altamirano
  Adolfo Bautista
  Ramón Morales
  Ricardo Osorio
  Pável Pardo
  Fredy Bareiro
  Ernesto Cristaldo
  Julio dos Santos
  Carlos Gamarra
  Julio González
  Santiago Acasiete
  Jefferson Farfán
  Flavio Maestri
  Roberto Palacios
  Claudio Pizarro
  Diego Forlán
  Paolo Montero
  Marcelo Sosa
  Massimo Margiotta
  Ruberth Morán

Awards
 Most Valuable Player:  Adriano
 Top Goalscorer:  Adriano (7 goals)

Team of the Tournament

Marketing

Mascot
The official mascot of the tournament was known as Chasqui. He was based on the Incan messengers of the same name.

Sponsorship
Global platinum sponsor
Petrobras
LG

Global gold sponsor
América Móvil (Telcel & Telmex are the brands advertised)
LAN Airlines

Global silver sponsor
Anheuser-Busch InBev (Corona (beer) is the brand advertised)
PepsiCo (Pepsi and Gatorade are the brands advertised)
51 (brand)
Volkswagen

Official Supplier
Tolteca

Theme songs
"Más Allá de los Sueños" by Peruvian singer-songwriter Gian Marco was the official theme song for the tournament. The song was well received and became popular in Latin America but mostly in Perú. Despite it being the official tournament theme song, Gian Marco was unable to perform it during the closing ceremony due to him being on tour at that time.
 "La Copa Será Tuya Al Final" by Betzaida was used by Univision as their theme song.

References

External links

 Copa América 2004 at RSSSF

 
2004 in South American football
2004
2004
2004 in Peruvian football
2004–05 in Costa Rican football
2004–05 in Mexican football
July 2004 sports events in South America
Sports competitions in Lima
2000s in Lima
Arequipa
Chiclayo
Piura Region
Tacna Region
Trujillo, Peru